2575 Bulgaria, provisional designation , is a stony Florian asteroid from the inner regions of the asteroid belt, approximately 7 kilometers in diameter. It was discovered on 4 August 1970, by Russian astronomer Tamara Smirnova at the Crimean Astrophysical Observatory in Nauchnyj, on the Crimean peninsula. It was named for country Bulgaria.

Classification and orbit 

Bulgaria is a member of the Flora family, one of the largest groups of stony asteroids in the main-belt. It orbits the Sun in the inner main-belt at a distance of 2.0–2.5 AU once every 3 years and 4 months (1,225 days). Its orbit has an eccentricity of 0.12 and an inclination of 5° with respect to the ecliptic.

Physical characteristics 

In the SMASS taxonomy, Bulgaria has been classified as a Sr-type, which transitions from common S-type asteroids to the rather rare R-type asteroids.

Bulgaria has a rotation period of 8.6 hours and an albedo of 0.24, as assumed by the Collaborative Asteroid Lightcurve Link.

Naming 

This minor planet was named after the European country Bulgaria. At the time of naming, it was the People's Republic of Bulgaria (1946–1990), a former satellite state of the Soviet Union and member of the Warsaw Pact. The official naming citation was published by the Minor Planet Center on 13 July 1984.

References

External links 
 2575 Bulgaria in NASA's Planetary Data System
 Asteroid Lightcurve Database (LCDB), query form (info )
 Dictionary of Minor Planet Names, Google books
 Asteroids and comets rotation curves, CdR – Observatoire de Genève, Raoul Behrend
 Discovery Circumstances: Numbered Minor Planets (1)-(5000)  – Minor Planet Center
 
 

002575
Discoveries by Tamara Mikhaylovna Smirnova
Named minor planets
002575
19700804